Schrade may refer to:

Schrade (surname)
Imperial Schrade, an American knife manufacturer
48422 Schrade, a main-belt asteroid
Christian Schrade (1876–1964), German architect who worked on churches
Leo Schrade (1903–1964), American musicologist of German birth
Ulrich Schrade (1943–2009), Polish philosopher
Willi Schrade (born 1935), German actor
Dirk Schrade (born 1978), German equestrian, Summer Olympics 2012